Single Parents is an American television sitcom that stars Taran Killam, Leighton Meester, Kimrie Lewis, Brad Garrett, and Jake Choi. It follows a group of adults who must venture through single parenthood with their young kids. The series premiered on ABC on September 26, 2018, and had a full 23-episode first season. ABC renewed the series for a second season, which premiered on September 25, 2019. In May 2020, the series was canceled after two seasons.

Premise
The series begins when the group meets Will, a divorced man in his 30s who is so focused on raising his daughter that he has lost sight of who he is as a man. When the other single parents see just how invested Will has become with PTA, parenting, and princesses, they band together to get him out in the dating world and make him realize that parenthood does not mean sacrificing everything about one's own identity.

Cast
 Taran Killam as Will Cooper, a 30-something single father with a daughter.
 Leighton Meester as Angie D'Amato, a single mother with a needy son.
 Brad Garrett as Douglas Fogerty, an older widowed single father with identical twin daughters who often puts them to work and an adult son.
 Kimrie Lewis as Poppy Banks, a single mother with a son.
 Jake Choi as Miggy Park, a young single father with a baby son named Jack. 
 Marlow Barkley as Sophie Cooper, Will's daughter.
 Tyler Wladis as Graham D'Amato, Angie's needy son, who is named for the craps dealer in Las Vegas who helped Angie when she went into labor.
 Devin Trey Campbell as Rory Banks, Poppy's son who has a knack for fashion.
 Mia and Ella Allan as Emma and Amy Fogerty, Douglas' identical twin daughters.

Production
The series initially received a put pilot commitment from ABC in October 2017, written by Liz Meriwether and J.J. Philbin, which later evolved to a series order with Jason Winer directing the pilot. In March 2018, Taran Killam, Leighton Meester, and Brad Garrett were announced to star in the series.

The first season premiered on September 26, 2018 and a full season was ordered in October, plus an additional episode, for a total of 23 episodes. Single Parents was renewed for a second season by ABC which premiered on September 25, 2019. On May 21, 2020, ABC canceled the series after two seasons.

Episodes

Series overview

Season 1 (2018–19)

Season 2 (2019–20)

Reception

Critical response
On review aggregation Rotten Tomatoes, the series holds an approval rating of 75% with an average rating of 7.14/10, based on 16 reviews. The site's critic consensus states: "While the jokes can be a little juvenile, Single Parents earns brownie points for a likable cast and a funny focus on parental struggles." Metacritic, which uses a weighted average, assigned the series a score of 67 out of 100 based on 10 critics, indicating "generally favorable reviews." Giving the show a B+, TVLine called it "hands down the fall’s funniest new sitcom." Caroline Framke with Variety says "even when Single Parents stumbles, it’s refreshing to see a comedy that acknowledges a different experience than most hangout sitcoms do," and that "hopefully, with a strong cast and writing team behind it, Single Parents can tap into [plenty of material there] and find a specific groove all its own."

In a TV Guide review, Malcolm Venable said the show "has an insightful goofiness about it that's absolutely endearing, and will likely be a balm for exhausted single parents keen to see a show that knows their struggle is real," but added, "It needs just a little more finesse to find its true north in terms of tone, and how to best employ the marquee talents Meester and Garrett, who sometimes feel underused as Killam's adorkable dad thing hogs most of the spotlight." He also noted that "what really makes Single Parents sparkle are the kids who are "legit funny, deft actors who steal pretty much every scene they're in." The Hollywood Reporter said "Single Parents feels like a comedy that goes for simple snark and believes it's a little more clever than it really is, but then had a bunch of network notes stuck to it about softening those right angles," with "a kind of paint-by-numbers approach." Along the same lines, the Los Angeles Times said the show "takes its cues from the network’s other family comedies, such as black-ish, but the jokes are too sophomoric to come close to the brilliance and humor of that award-winning show or the Emmy-amassing Modern Family."

Ratings

Season 1

Season 2

References

External links
 
 
 

2010s American single-camera sitcoms
2018 American television series debuts
2020 American television series endings
2020s American single-camera sitcoms
American Broadcasting Company original programming
English-language television shows
Television series about dysfunctional families
Television series by 20th Century Fox Television
Television series by ABC Studios
Television series about single parent families